Yohan Ben Alouane (also known as Yohan Benalouane; born 28 March 1987) is a professional footballer who plays as a defender for Italian  club Novara. Born and brought up in France, Benalouane represented the country as a youth before switching to Tunisia at senior international level.

Club career

Saint-Étienne
Benalouane started out his professional career at a French club Saint-Étienne, playing exclusively for the reserves in 2005 before successfully promoted to the first team in 2007.

Cesena
On 31 August 2010, Benalouane joined Serie A club Cesena for an undisclosed fee. After a particularly poor performance in a 2–0 loss against Bologna in December 2010, Benalouane was substituted. On leaving the pitch, and being jeered by Cesena supporters, he stormed past the bench and headed straight down the tunnel. He later publicly apologised for his behaviour.

Parma and Atalanta
In the summer of 2012, Benalouane was loaned to Parma, making his move permanent in July 2013 in a co-ownership deal. He signed a five-year contract with the Serie A outfit. On 3 January 2014, he joined Atalanta on a loan deal.

Leicester City
On 3 August 2015, Benalouane joined Premier League club Leicester City on a four-year contract for an undisclosed fee, reported to be €8 million. On 31 January 2016, he joined Italian club ACF Fiorentina on loan until the end of the season, but did not play for the club due to injury. In June 2016, Benalouane filed an appeal with the Lega Serie A over unpaid wages from Fiorentina, whose sporting director claimed Leicester had deceived them over the player's fitness. He played only four league games (all as a substitute) in the 2015–16 Premier League season, when Leicester became champions, making him ineligible for a winner's medal (minimum five league matches required).

Following the close of the transfer window, Benalouane was excluded from Leicester City's finalised squad for the 2016–17 Premier League season. Benalouane spent most of the season playing for the reserves, but returned to the first team in January 2017 following the departures of Luis Hernández and Jeffrey Schlupp. He played his first senior game of the 2016–17 season in a 3–1 FA Cup fourth-round replay win over Derby County on 8 February 2017.

Nottingham Forest
On 18 January 2019 it was announced that Benalouane had become new manager Martin O'Neill's first signing for Nottingham Forest. He made his debut for the club the following day, playing the full 90 minutes of a 0–1 home defeat to Bristol City. He scored his first goal for the club in a 1–0 win over arch-rivals Derby County on 25 February 2019.

Aris
After having his contract cancelled with Forest by mutual consent, Benalouane subsequently joined Super League Greece side Aris until the end of the 2021–22 season.

Novara
On 14 July 2022, Benalouane signed a one-year contract, with an option to extend, with Novara in the Italian third-tier Serie C.

International career
Benalouane was eligible to play either for France (by place of birth) or Tunisia (through parentage). Despite playing once for the French under 21 team, he submitted a transfer request to represent the Tunisian senior team in 2010. However, despite receiving a call-up against Chad in an African Cup of Nations qualifier, he missed the game because he failed to be vaccinated prior to travel to Chad.

In October he refused to join Tunisia for the match against Togo, for which he expected to receive a call-up from Laurent Blanc instead. However, FIFA warned Benalouane that as the paperwork had been completed, he could represent Tunisia only, a refusal to show up may risk a ban in club football. Benalouane refused another call-up in August 2013.

In March 2018, Benalouane was once again called up by Tunisia, and this time he accepted the call up. Benalouane made his debut for Tunisia in a 1–0 victory over Iran on 23 March 2018, playing the full match.
He was named in Tunisia's final 23-man squad for the 2018 World Cup in Russia.

Career statistics

Club

International

References

External links

1987 births
Living people
People from Bagnols-sur-Cèze
Sportspeople from Gard
Association football central defenders
Citizens of Tunisia through descent
Tunisian footballers
Tunisia international footballers
French footballers
France under-21 international footballers
French sportspeople of Tunisian descent
Ligue 1 players
Serie A players
Premier League players
English Football League players
Super League Greece players
Serie C players
AS Saint-Étienne players
A.C. Cesena players
Parma Calcio 1913 players
Atalanta B.C. players
Leicester City F.C. players
ACF Fiorentina players
Nottingham Forest F.C. players
Aris Thessaloniki F.C. players
Novara F.C. players
French expatriate footballers
Expatriate footballers in Italy
Expatriate footballers in England
Expatriate footballers in Greece
Tunisian expatriate footballers
2018 FIFA World Cup players
Footballers from Occitania (administrative region)